Logan Bayliss-Brow (born 29 August 1999) is a Scotland international rugby league footballer who plays as a  for the Brisbane Broncos in the NRL.

Background
Bayliss-Brow was born in Nambour, Queensland, Australia. He is of Scottish descent.

Playing career

Early career
Bayliss-Brow played for the North Queensland Cowboys Holden Cup team in 2017. In 2018 he played for the Townsville Blackhawks in the Hastings Deering Colts competition. He was then promoted into the Cowboys NRL squad for the 2019 NRL season on a Development contract.  He was allocated to the Mackay Cutters Queensland Cup team for the 2019 season. 

In 2020, Bayliss-Brow moved to the Brisbane Tigers Queensland Cup team. Following 2020, he signed with the Souths Logan Magpies and signed a train and trial deal with the Brisbane Broncos for the 2021 season. He then signed a contract with Broncos for the 2022 and 2023 seasons.  

Bayliss-Brow represented the Queensland Maroons (U20s) team in 2019 and was 18th man in 2018.

International career

References

External links
Brisbane Broncos profile
Scotland profile
Scotland RL profile

1999 births
Living people
Australian rugby league players
Australian people of Scottish descent
Rugby league players from Nambour, Queensland
Rugby league props
Scotland national rugby league team players